Scopula calothysanis is a moth of the family Geometridae. It was described by Claude Herbulot in 1965. It is endemic to Madagascar.

References

Moths described in 1965
calothysanis
Moths of Madagascar
Taxa named by Claude Herbulot